Government procurement in Poland is regulated by the Public Procurement Law, an act of parliament of 29 January 2004.

The Act specifies:
 Public procurement rules
 Principles of contract announcement
 Mode of public procurement procedures
 Public procurement modes (tender in the restricted and unrestricted, competitive dialogue, negotiated procedure with publication and without notice, procurement, request for quotation, and electronic bidding)
 The rules for selecting the best bid
 Rules for documenting procedures
 Rules for the conclusion of framework agreements
 Rules for the establishment and operation of a dynamic purchasing system
 Rules for the contest
 Public procurement rules by concessionaires works and utilities procurement
 Contracting rules on public procurement
 Powers and operation of the President of Public Procurement Office
 Principles of National Board of Appeal
 Remedies in the proceedings of the public procurement
 The principle of liability for violation of provisions of the Act

External links
Public Procurement Office of Poland

Law of Poland
Poland